The Ninth Government of the Republic of Croatia was the first of two Croatian Government cabinets led by Prime Minister Ivo Sanader. It was announced on 23 December 2003 and its term ended on 12 January 2008. All but two cabinet members came from the ruling Croatian Democratic Union (HDZ) party, following their win in the 2003 parliamentary elections (with the exception of Dragan Primorac, who was formally a non-party minister at the time of his appointment, but later joined HDZ and Vesna Škare-Ožbolt who had been a member of HDZ in the 1990s but then joined the Democratic Centre, a small centre-right party which allied with HDZ after the 2003 elections).

Motions of confidence

Party breakdown 
Party breakdown of cabinet ministers (12 January 2008):

Changes from Cabinet of Ivica Račan II
Since Račan's centre-left coalition was replaced by the centre-right HDZ government, all the ministers were newly appointed. Furthermore, some ministries were re-organised:
Ministry of Labour and Social Welfare was dissolved; it was then merged into Ministry of Health (which then became Ministry of Health and Social Welfare) and Ministry of Economy.
Ministry for Crafts, Small and Medium-sized entrepreneurship was also dissolved and merged with the Ministry of Economy, which then became Ministry of Economy, Labour and Entrepreneurship
Ministry of Agriculture and Forest Management was renamed Ministry of Agriculture, Forest and Water Management
Ministry of Veterans' Affairs was renamed and expanded into Minister of Family, Veterans' Affairs and Intergenerational Solidarity
Ministry of Tourism was dissolved and merged with Ministry of Maritime Affairs, Transport and Communications to form the new Ministry of the Sea, Tourism, Transport and Development
Ministry of Justice, Public Administration and Local Self-government was renamed simply Ministry of Justice
Minister of Public Works, Construction and Reconstruction was dissolved, and merged with the Ministry of Environmental Protection and Physical Planning to form the Ministry of Environmental Protection, Physical Planning and Construction
Ministry of Science and Technology and Ministry of Education and Sports were merged into Ministry of Science, Education and Sports

These changes had brought down the number of ministries from 19 in Račan's cabinet to 14 under PM Sanader. Also, the ministries of European Integration (headed by Kolinda Grabar-Kitarović) and Foreign Affairs (headed by Miomir Žužul) were later merged in February 2005, which further reduced the total number of government ministries to just 13.

List of ministers and portfolios
Some periods in the table extend after before 12 January 2008 because the minister continued to hold the post in the following Cabinet of Ivo Sanader II and Cabinet of Jadranka Kosor. The cabinet had two Deputy Prime Ministers: Jadranka Kosor and Andrija Hebrang, who both also served as ministers of their respective portfolios. When Hebrang resigned from both his posts as Deputy Prime Minister and Minister of Health and Social Welfare in February 2005, he was replaced by Damir Polančec (as Deputy Prime Minister) and Neven Ljubičić (who took over his portfolio).

References

External links
Official website of the Croatian Government
Chronology of Croatian cabinets at Hidra.hr 

Sanader, 1
2003 establishments in Croatia
2008 disestablishments in Croatia
Cabinets established in 2003
Cabinets disestablished in 2008